Football Club Dynamo Kyiv is a Ukrainian professional football club based in Kyiv. Founded in 1927 as a Kyivan football team of republican branch of the bigger Soviet Dynamo Sports Society, the club as a separate business entity was officially formed only in 1989 and currently plays in the Ukrainian Premier League, and has never been relegated to a lower division. The club has secured brand rights from the Ukrainian Dynamo society and has no direct relations to the sports society since 1989. Their home is the 70,050 capacity Olimpiyskiy National Sports Complex.

Since 1936, Dynamo Kyiv has spent its entire history in the top league of Soviet and later Ukrainian football. Its most successful periods are associated with Valeriy Lobanovskyi, who coached the team during three stints, leading them to numerous domestic and European titles. In 1961, the club became first-ever in the history of Soviet football that managed to overcome the total hegemony of Moscow-based clubs in the Soviet Top League. The Spartak Moscow–Dynamo Kyiv rivalry that began in the mid-1970s, is widely considered to have been one of the most exciting football rivalries in the Soviet Union. Since becoming the first Soviet football club to participate in UEFA competition in 1965, Dynamo Kyiv has played in European competitions almost every season.

Over its history, Dynamo Kyiv have won 16 Ukrainian top-flight league titles, 13 Soviet top-flight league titles, 11 Ukrainian national cup competitions, 9 Soviet national cup competitions, and three continental titles (including two UEFA Cup Winners' Cups). Its two European Cup Winners' Cups make it one of the only two Soviet clubs to have won a UEFA trophy, the other being Dinamo Tbilisi. The Dynamo Kyiv first team became a base team for the Soviet Union national football team in the 1970–1980s and the Ukraine national football team in the 1990–2000s. The two stars on the club's crest each signify 10 top-flight seasons Dynamo Kyiv won. The club was recognised as the Eastern European Club of the 20th Century by France-Presse.

History

Early history

Today's club was established based on the first squad of Kyiv's branch of the all-Union Dynamo sports society and its republican branch in the Ukrainian SSR, originally based out of Kharkiv. The Soviet government relocated capital to Kyiv in 1934. The all-Union Dynamo sports society was a sports department of the Soviet state security KGB, originally Cheka-OGPU. During the Soviet period Dynamo's players same as players of all Dynamos in the Soviet Union were officially Soviet uniform servicemembers earning rank, salary, and pension when playing on the team of masters.

On 13 May 1927, the statute of the Kyivan Proletarian Sport Society (PST) Dynamo was officially registered by the special commission in affairs of public organizations and unions of the Kyiv district. The All-Union sport society of Dynamo in Moscow was formed earlier in 1923 on the initiative of the Felix Dzerzhinsky. Under the banner of Kyivan Dynamo gathered the representatives of the GPU the State Political Directorate, the Soviet secret police, the best footballers of which defended the honors of the Trade Union club "Sovtorgsluzhashchie", a portmanteau for Soviet retail servicemen.

The leadership of Dynamo did not dare to reorganize the well-established club and the main title contender in the middle of a playing season. Therefore the first mention of the football club Dynamo could only be found on 5 April 1928 in the Russian-language newspaper (at that time) Vecherniy Kiev ("Evening Kyiv").

It was then when by the initiative of Semyon Zapadny, chief of the Kyiv GPU, the football team was created. His deputy, Serhiy Barminsky, started to form the team not only out of regular chekists (members of the Soviet secret police), but also footballers of other clubs in the city among which is mentioned a team "Sovtorgsluzhaschie". All the footballers were either part of the consolidated city team or the city champions. The newly created team played its first official match on 1 July 1928 against a local consolidated city team while visiting Bila Tserkva. Already on the fifth minute the Dynamo-men opened the score in the game, however, at the end the club lost it 1–2. On 15 July, the Bila Tserkva newspaper Radyanska Nyva ("Soviet Fields") put it in such words:

The next match played by Dynamo was on 17 July 1928 hosting another Dynamo from the port city of Odessa. As the club gained more experience and played on a regular basis, it started to fill the stadium with spectators with both the club and football in general gaining popularity in Soviet Ukraine.

Its club stadium Dynamo opened on 12 June 1933, a year before the Soviet government turned the city into capital of the Soviet Ukraine.

During the Soviet era, the club was one of the main rivals, and often the only rival, to football clubs from Moscow. Its ability to challenge the dominance of the Moscow clubs in Soviet football, and frequently defeat them to win the Soviet championship, was a matter of national pride for Ukraine. Leaders of the Ukrainian SSR unofficially regarded the club as their national team and provided it with generous support, making Dynamo a professional team of international importance.

In 1936, the first Soviet Championship was played, and Dynamo Kyiv was one of the pioneers of the newly formed league. The club's early successes were however limited to a second-place finish in 1936 and third place in 1937. In the 1941 season, the club only played nine matches as World War II interrupted league play.

The Death Match

The propaganda story is often told of how the Dynamo team, playing as "Start, City of Kyiv All-Stars", was executed by a firing squad in the summer of 1942 for defeating an All-Star team from the German armed forces by 5–1. The actual story, as recounted by Y. Kuznetsov, is considerably more complex. Still, this match has subsequently become known in the Soviet media as "The Death Match".

After the Nazi occupation of Ukraine began, former professional football players (Dynamo and Lokomotyv) found employment in the city's Bakery No. 3, and continued to play amateur football. The team participated in exhibition games that took place in the city among various other teams including teams composed of the Wehrmacht soldiers. The Kyiv's team played under the name of "Start", comprising eight players from Dynamo Kyiv (Nikolai Trusevych, Mikhail Svyridovskiy, Nikolai Korotkykh, Oleksiy Klymenko, Fedir Tyutchev, Mikhail Putistin, Ivan Kuzmenko, Makar Honcharenko) and three players from Lokomotyv Kyiv (Vladimir Balakin, Vasyl Sukharev and Mikhail Melnyk).

In July and August 1942, "Start" played a series of matches against the Germans and their allies. On 12 July, a German army team was defeated. A stronger army team was selected for the next match on 17 July, which "Start" defeated 6–0. On 19 July, "Start" defeated the Hungarian team MSG Wal 5–1. The Hungarians proposed a return match, held on 26 July, but were defeated again, 3–2.

"Start"'s streak was noticed and a match was announced for 6 August against a "most powerful" "undefeated" German Luftwaffe Flakelf (anti-aircraft artillery) team, but despite the game being talked up by the newspapers, they failed to report the 5–1 result. On 9 August, "Start" played a "friendly" against Flakelf and again defeated them. The team defeated Rukh 8–0 on 16 August, and afterwards, some of "Start"'s players were arrested by the Gestapo, tortured – Nikolai Korotkykh died during the torture – and sent to the nearby labour camp at Syrets. There is speculation that the players were arrested due to the intrigues of Georgy Shvetsov, founder and trainer of the "Rukh" team, as the arrests were made in a couple of days after "Start" defeated "Rukh".

In February 1943, following an attack by partisans or a conflict of the prisoners and administration, one-third of the prisoners at Syrets were killed in reprisal, including Ivan Kuzmenko, Oleksey Klymenko and goalkeeper Nikolai Trusevich. Three of the other players – Makar Honcharenko, Fedir Tyutchev and Mikhail Sviridovskiy – who were in a work squad in the city that day, were arrested a few days later or, according to other sources, escaped and hid in the city until it was liberated.

The story inspired three films: the 1961 Hungarian film drama Two Half Times in Hell, the 1981 American film Escape to Victory and the 2012 Russian film Match.

Last Soviet years

In 1989, the club transitioned into an independent company being disassociated from the Ukrainian republican society of Dynamo. During the last seasons of the Soviet Top League, it competed in the national colors of Ukraine as part of the national movement that grew very popular.

Ukrainian Independence

After the dissolution of the Soviet Union, the club became a member of the newly formed Ukrainian Premier League. By the summer of 1993, however, the club was in crisis as the economic policy of Dynamo president Viktor Bezverkhy set Dynamo on the path to bankruptcy. On 19 July 1993, an extraordinary assembly of coaches and players fired  Bezverkhy and established a stock society called "Football Club "Dynamo (Kyiv)". Hryhoriy Surkis was elected president of the new company. The republican and city councils of the Dynamo society agreed to hand over two training centers and Dynamo Stadium to Dynamo Kiev. The founders besides the football team and the Dynamo councils became also the commercial consulting centre Slavutych and the British firm Newport Management. A review board was created, consisting of directors of the Ministry of Interior of Ukraine, and the Security Service, Border Troops, and General Prosecutor of Ukraine.

Dynamo's status as the country's principal club did not change, however, as they went on to dominate domestic competitions, winning or being runner-up in every year of the Premier League's existence and becoming a fixture in the UEFA Champions League. Its main rival in Ukraine is Shakhtar Donetsk, a club from the Donbas region, that came second to Dynamo several times before winning its first Premier League in 2002. The matches between these two sides are called the Ukrainian derby.

In 2007, as a part of club's 80-year anniversary, two gold stars were added to the top of the crest, representing ten Ukrainian championship titles and ten USSR champion titles. Due to club's poor performance in the UEFA Champions League during the last two seasons, Dynamo's management took a somewhat unexpected decision by appointing the first foreign manager in the club's history. Previously, only former players or Dynamo football academy graduates became managers, but in December 2007 Russian coach Yuri Semin was invited to become the new manager of Dynamo Kyiv. However, the club yielded to Shakhtar Donetsk in both the Ukrainian Cup and Premier League in 2008. In 2009. in the club's most successful European campaign since 1999, it reached the semi-finals of the UEFA Cup (eliminating such teams as Valencia and Paris Saint-Germain) but was defeated at that stage by Shakhtar Donetsk. However, 2009 also brought success, as the club celebrated its 13th Premier League title.

In a season which contained their record win, a 9–0 victory over Illichivets Mariupol, the club only managed to finish runners-up in the league in 2010–11, after Shakhtar Donetsk. In what would be icon Andriy Shevchenko's final season at the club, Dynamo also finished as runners-up in 2011–12. In the 2011–12 season Dynamo also managed to reach the group stage of the Europa League after being eliminated in the Champions League third qualifying round by Rubin Kazan by 0–2 in Kyiv and 2–1 in Kazan. In the Europa League playoffs, the club managed to defeat Litex Lovech with a 3–1 aggregate score. In the group stage, Dynamo finished third after a disappointing campaign in a group containing Beşiktaş, Maccabi Tel Aviv and Stoke City.

In April 2013, it was announced the club would play two European ties behind closed doors due to racism from fans during previous European ties. In the 2012–13 season, the club managed to qualify for the Champions League group stage after eliminating Feyenoord 3–1 and Borussia Mönchengladbach 4–3 on aggregate and qualified for the Champions League group stage. Dynamo was placed in a group with Paris Saint-Germain, Porto and Dinamo Zagreb and finished in third place with only five points and was eliminated in the Europa League round of 32 by Bordeaux 2–1 on aggregate. In the Premier League, Dynamo finished third, whereas in the Cup, it was eliminated in the round of 32. Overall, the 2012–13 season was a disappointment for Dynamo. The 2013–14 season was an equally disappointing season as Dynamo finished in fourth place in the league, the worst since the establishment of the Premier League and only managed to reach the round of 32 in the Europa League where it was eliminated by Valencia 2–0 on aggregate. Oleh Blokhin was sacked and was replaced by former player Serhii Rebrov. As a result, Dynamo managed to win the 2013–14 Ukrainian Cup for the first time in five years.

Dynamo's revival

In the beginning of the 2014–15 season, Dynamo signed many promising players such as Aleksandar Dragović, Jeremain Lens (departed after end of the season), Łukasz Teodorczyk and Vitorino Antunes. Under Rebrov, Dynamo won the 2014–15 Ukrainian Premier League – undefeated – and the 2014–15 Ukrainian Cup to earn a domestic double for the first time in eight years. In the 2014–15 Europa League, Dynamo comfortably qualified from a group containing Aalborg BK, Steaua București and Rio Ave, finishing in first place with 15 points. In the round of 32, the club eliminated Guingamp 4–3 on aggregate, and in the round of 16, eliminated Everton 6–4 on aggregate after a spectacular 5–2 performance in Kyiv. Rebrov prioritized the passing game but focused on solid defensive foundations. However, in the quarter-finals of the Europa League, Dynamo was eliminated by Fiorentina 3–1 on aggregate.

In the beginning of the 2015–16 season, Dynamo signed the highly talented Derlis González and was drawn in Group G of the 2015–16 Champions League alongside Chelsea F.C., FC Porto and Maccabi Tel Aviv F.C. Dynamo finished in second place with 11 points after a spectacular performance and a memorable 0–2 in Porto. However, Dynamo was punished by UEFA for a racist incident in the home game against Chelsea where four black men were attacked in the stands by Dynamo fans. 

Despite this, Dynamo reached the round of 16 in the Champions League for the first time since 2000, where it was drawn with Manchester City. Dynamo was eliminated 1–3 on aggregate but managed to hold an impressive 0–0 draw in Manchester. Dynamo's domestic performance was equally memorable as the club celebrated the 2015–16 Ukrainian Premier League only losing to archrival Shakhtar Donetsk 0–3 twice and was eliminated in the quarter-finals of the 2015–16 Ukrainian Cup. At the end of the season, several star performers (such as Miguel Veloso, Aleksandar Dragović, Younès Belhanda and Łukasz Teodorczyk) departed the club and were not replaced.

Stagnation period

The 2016–17 season was a relative disappointment for Dynamo, as the club finished in second place in the 2016–17 Ukrainian Premier League, behind Shakhtar Donetsk, with a difference of 13 points after a string of disappointing results. In the 2016–17 Champions League, the club was drawn in Group B alongside Napoli, Benfica and Beşiktaş J.K. Dynamo finished in fourth place after a dismal campaign, but managed to record a memorable 6–0 win over Beşiktaş in Kyiv. In the winter transfer window, Dynamo signed promising defenders Aleksandar Pantić and Tamás Kádár and focused on youth academy talents such as Viktor Tsyhankov, Artem Besyedin and Volodymyr Shepelyev, managing to improve its performances. Dynamo lost the 2016–17 Ukrainian Cup to Shakhtar Donetsk 0–1 in the final.

For the 2017–18 season, after Serhii Rebrov departed, the club appointed former player Alyaksandr Khatskevich as Rebrov's replacement. In Khatskevich's first two seasons at the helm, Dynamo failed to qualify for the UEFA Champions League group stage, having to settle for the UEFA Europa League group stage instead. Both times they were eventually eliminated in the Round of 16, first by S.S. Lazio (2–4 on aggregate) in 2017–18, and then by Chelsea F.C. (0–8 on aggregate) in 2018–19. Domestically, Dynamo remained firmly in second place behind Shakhtar Donetsk in the Ukrainian Premier League. Despite the apparent lack of progress in the results, Khatskevich was rewarded with a two-year contract extension.

However, only six matches into his new extension, Khatskevich was fired on 14 August 2019, after once again failing to advance to the UEFA Champions League group stage. Dynamo's Sports Director, Oleksiy Mykhaylychenko, was appointed as manager. Despite the change, the results on the field hardly improved, as Dynamo was eliminated from continental competitions by placing 3rd in Group B of the 2019–20 UEFA Europa League group stage.

On 23 July 2020, Mircea Lucescu became the head coach of Dynamo. Lucescu signed a two-year contract.

Scandals

FootballLeaks-2 
German journalists from Der Spiegel Rafael Buschmann and Michael Wulzinger published a book titled Football Leaks – 2.

A separate part titled "Ukrainische Bruderschaft" (Ukrainian Brotherhood) describes brothers Ihor and Hryhorii Surkis's activities in the football sphere and their relation to the "Newport" offshore. All FC "Dynamo’s" activities are financed by this company. The authors refer to Football Leaks documents.

The book tells that starting from 1993, all the financial activities of Kyiv-based FC "Dynamo" have been performed via the company 'Newport", controlled by the club's boss Ihor Surkis. Having cited the FIFA data, the authors noted that in 2011–2017 the "Newport" has spent US$324 million to buy 82 players for FC "Dynamo". The taxes from this sum haven't been paid in Ukraine.

Symbols

Colours

Dynamo's traditional colours are white and dark blue, with white being the predominant colour. Throughout their history the club has usually played in a white shirt and blue shorts. This was changed in 1961 when a blue sash was added to the kit; it was removed soon afterwards. In 2004, the club's management decided to restore the famous sash as a talisman. It was added to the away kit and remained there until the beginning of the 2008–09 season, when it was replaced by a white kit with a shirt having thin blue vertical stripes, the first time in over 50 years that a club had worn such a pattern.

During the last two seasons before the breakup of the Soviet Union, Dynamo's kit was similar to Metalist, yellow shirts and blue shorts. This color scheme carried a symbolic meaning, representing the national colours of the yet-not-adopted Ukraine national flag. In the 1990 Soviet Cup Final, the yellow-blue Dynamo team thrashed the all-Red Lokomotiv 6–1 at Luzhniki Stadium. In the early years of Ukrainian independence, the club swapped their yellow colour for white. However blue remained one of Dynamo's colours and is still a main colour of the club's away kit.

The club's current sponsors, New Balance and ABank24, feature on the team shirt. New Balance is also the manufacturer of the kit. Among former sponsors there were Ostchem Holding, Nadra Bank, PrivatBank, Prominvestbank, Ukrtelecom, and others.

Crest
Being a member of the All-Union Sports Society Dynamo, the Dynamo football team of Kyiv adopted the same emblem of the Dynamo's sports society as its first logo, which featured on their shirts since 1927 and was a cursive blue Cyrillic letter "Д" (D) in a vertical rhombus. Similar emblem existed in other Soviet football teams throughout the Soviet Union such as FC Dynamo Moscow, FC Dinamo Tbilisi, FC Dinamo Minsk, and others. The idea of symbol is attributed to a native of Ukraine Leonid Nedolya-Honcharenko who at that time served as a chief of political department of the OGPU troops in Moscow District.

The symbol the club obtained on franchise rights from the Ukrainian Fitness and Sports Society "Dynamo" (see Dynamo–Ukraine). Over the years, the club's logo has undergone many changes and replacements, but the cursive "D" has remained ever since.

In 2003 after Dynamo won their 10th domestic trophy, a golden star was added at the top of the logo to celebrate the club's success. The second star was added to the logo in 2007 during celebrations of Dynamo's 80-year anniversary. Although Dynamo has won only 15 Ukrainian league titles, their 13 titles as USSR Champions were taken into account.

Achievements and honours

Dynamo Kyiv has participated in all of the USSR and Ukrainian championships to date, and has won both competitions more times than any other team. The club's best performances were in the 1970s and 1980s, a time in which the Soviet Union national football team was composed mostly of players from the club. Dynamo Kyiv tied the national record for winning three consecutive Soviet Premier League titles in 1966, 1967, and 1968. 

Dynamo Kyiv won the UEFA Cup Winners' Cup in 1975 and 1986 as well as the European Super Cup in 1975, after two games against Bayern Munich. In 1977, 1987, and 1999, the club reached the semi-finals of the UEFA Champions League. These victories are associated with the name of Valeriy Lobanovskyi, who played for the club in the 1960s and later became the club's long-term head coach. In 2009 the club reached the semi-final of the UEFA Cup.

Dynamo striker Oleh Blokhin is the Soviet Premier League's all-time top scorer with 211 goals, and has also made more appearances than any other player in the championship's history with 432.

Dynamo Kyiv is also was one of the base clubs of the Soviet Union national football team and many players of the club represented the Soviet Union at international level. After fall of the Soviet Union, Dynamo became the base club of the Ukraine national football team.

Dynamo striker Oleh Blokhin is the Soviet Union national football team all-time top scorer with 42 goals, and has also made more appearances than any other player for the team with 112. Two other Dynamo strikers – Oleh Protasov and Viktor Kolotov – are among the Soviet Union national football team top five best scorers with 29 and 22 goals respectfully. Two other Dynamo players – Anatoliy Demyanenko and Volodymyr Bezsonov – are among the Soviet Union national football team top five players with most appearances 80 and 79 respectfully.

Four former Dynamo's players were appointed as a head coach of the Soviet Union national team, among which Valeriy Lobanovsky, Oleh Bazylevych, Vladimir Salkov and Anatoliy Byshovets. All head coaches of the Ukraine national team but two were at some time former players of Dynamo Kyiv.

Ukrainian competitions
Ukrainian Premier League (16, record):
 1992–93, 1993–94, 1994–95, 1995–96, 1996–97, 1997–98, 1998–99, 1999–2000, 2000–01, 2002–03, 2003–04, 2006–07, 2008–09, 2014–15, 2015–16, 2020–21
Ukrainian Cup (13):
 1992–93, 1995–96, 1997–98, 1998–99, 1999–2000, 2002–03, 2004–05, 2005–06, 2006–07, 2013–14, 2014–15, 2019–20, 2020–21
Ukrainian Super Cup (9):
 2004, 2006, 2007, 2009, 2011, 2016, 2018, 2019, 2020

Soviet competitions
Soviet Top League (13, record):
1961, 1966, 1967, 1968, 1971, 1974, 1975, 1977, 1980, 1981, 1985, 1986, 1990
Soviet Cup (9):
1954, 1964, 1966, 1974, 1978, 1982, 1985, 1987, 1990
Soviet Super Cup (3, record):
1981, 1986, 1987
Cup of the Ukrainian SSR (7, record):
 1936, 1937, 1938, 1944, 1946, 1947, 1948
Championship of the Proletarian Sports Society Dynamo (3):
 1931, 1933, 1935

European competitions
UEFA Cup Winners' Cup (2):
 1974–75, 1985–86
UEFA Super Cup (1):
 1975

International competitions
Commonwealth of Independent States Cup (4):
1996, 1997, 1998, 2002

Friendly competitions
Channel One Cup / United Tournament (2):
2008, 2013
Amsterdam Tournament (1):
1986
Mohammed V Trophy (1):
1975

Individual player awards

Several players have won individual awards during or for their time with Dynamo Kyiv

European Footballer of the Year (Ballon d'Or)
Oleg Blokhin (1975)
Ihor Belanov (1986)

UEFA Golden Player Award
Oleg Blokhin

FIFA 100
Andriy Shevchenko

European Championship winners

Two players have won the European Championship whilst at Dynamo Kyiv.
Yuriy Voynov (France 1960)
Yury Kovalyov (France 1960)

Ukrainian Footballer of the Year
Viktor Serebryanikov (1969)
Volodymyr Muntyan (1970)
Yevhen Rudakov (1971)
Oleg Blokhin (1972, 1973, 1974, 1975, 1976, 1977, 1978, 1980, 1981)
Anatoliy Demyanenko (1982, 1985)
Oleksandr Zavarov (1986)
Oleksiy Mykhaylychenko (1987, 1988)
Volodymyr Bezsonov (1989)
Sergei Yuran (1990)
Akhrik Tsveiba (1991)
Viktor Leonenko (1992, 1993, 1994)
Yuriy Kalitvintsev (1995)
Serhii Rebrov (1996, 1998)
Andriy Shevchenko (1997, 1999)
Artem Milevskyi (2008, 2009)
Andriy Yarmolenko (2013, 2014, 2015, 2017)
Viktor Tsyhankov (2018)

Soviet Footballer of the Year
Andriy Biba (1966)
Volodymyr Muntyan (1969)
Yevhen Rudakov (1971)
Oleg Blokhin (1973, 1974, 1975)
Anatoliy Demyanenko (1985)
Oleksandr Zavarov (1986)
Oleksiy Mykhaylychenko (1988)

Hall of Fame
While there is no such institution in the club, it does honor its notables players as "Golden Names", while coaches are honored as  "Legendary Mentors".

Golden Names
Oleh Blokhin
Andriy Shevchenko
Ihor Belanov
Oleh Husyev
 Valyantsin Byalkevich
Andriy Husin
Valeriy Lobanovskyi
Hennadiy Lytovchenko
Vadym Yevtushenko
 Maksim Shatskikh
Vladimir Veremeyev
Mykhailo Fomenko
Serhii Rebrov
Volodymyr Troshkin
Volodymyr Muntyan
 Viktor Kolotov
Pavlo Vinkovatov
Valeriy Porkuyan
 Dezyderiy Tovt (Dezso Toth)
Anatoliy Konkov
Viktor Chanov
 Vitaliy Holubyev
Viktor Matviyenko
Mykola Makhynia
 Mykhaylo Mykhalyna
Oleh Luzhnyi

Volodymyr Bezsonov
Vasyl Rats (László Rácz)
Oleksandr Zavarov
Vasyl Turyanchyk
Mykhaylo Mykhaylov
Andriy Biba
Volodymyr Onyshchenko
Anatoliy Puzach
Oleksiy Mykhailychenko
Anatoliy Demyanenko
Vadym Sosnykhin
Vitaliy Kosovskyi
Viktor Zhylin
 Mykola Koltsov
Leonid Buryak
 Konstantin Schegotsky
Mykhailo Koman
 Anatoliy Byshovets
 Andrei Zazroyev
Viktor Khlus
Serhiy Fedorov
Vitaliy Khmelnytskyi
Oleh Bazylevych
Viktor Kanevskyi
Fedir Medvid (Ferenc Medvigy)
Aleksandr Khapsalis
Serhiy Krulykovskyi

Abram Lerman
Valentyn Troyanovskyi
Serhiy Zhuravlyov
 Yevhen Rudakov
 Yuriy Voynov
Viktor Bannikov
Makar Honcharenko
Yozhef Sabo (József Szabó)
Oleh Makarov
Oleksandr Holovko
 Leonid Ostrovski
Viktor Fomin
Serhiy Baltacha
Ivan Yaremchuk
Oleh Kuznetsov
Viktor Serebrianikov
Petro Slobodyan
Pavlo Yakovenko
Andriy Bal
Stefan Reshko
 Yuriy Romenskyi
 Anatoliy Suchkov
Volodymyr Anufriyenko
Volodymyr Levchenko
Volodymyr Shcheholkov
 Yuriy Kalitvintsev

Legendary Mentors
Valeriy Lobanovskyi
 Aleksandr Sevidov
 Oleg Oshenkov
 Viktor Maslov
 Vyacheslav Solovyov
 Viktor Terentiev
Oleh Bazylevych

Infrastructure

Stadiums

The club's home ground, Valeriy Lobanovskyi Dynamo Stadium, is situated in a park located in the centre of the city, close to the Dnieper River bank. The stadium holds 16,873 spectators, and has been the club's home since 1934. When it was built the stadium's capacity was 23,000. After being destroyed in 1941 during World War II, it was rebuilt in 1954. By the end of the 20th century, the stadium was reconstructed as a football-only venue with individual seats. These changes reduced the facility's capacity to its present one. In 2002 after the sudden death of Dynamo's longtime player and coach Valeriy Lobanovskyi, the stadium was renamed in his honour. After NSK Olympiyskiy was closed for reconstruction in 2008, Dynamo also began to play its European games at the Lobanovsky Stadium.

Due to a high demand for European fixtures of the club throughout its European history Dynamo played a majority of their home fixtures at Kyiv's and Ukraine's largest stadium, the Olimpiyskiy National Sports Complex, historically dubbed The Republican Stadium, which held 83,450 spectators. The stadium has been the home of the Ukrainian Cup final since its inaugural game in 1992 and up until 2007. The stadium was closed for a major reconstruction in 2008, after Ukraine and Poland were chosen to host the UEFA Euro 2012. The Olympiysky became Kyiv's main venue as well as the stadium that hosted the final; it also become an UEFA Elite rated stadium.

The team also has a modern-equipped training base in the Kyiv suburb of Koncha-Zaspa. The club maintains its own football school for children and youths, also situated in Kyiv. Junior Dynamo teams are colloquially known as Dynamo-2 and Dynamo-3. Its reserves team -called "double" (дубль) in both Ukrainian and Russian- participates in the national Reserves tournament, where "doubles" of all 16 Vyscha Liga teams compete. Many notable Dynamo Kyiv players progressed through the club's youth system, among them is Andriy Shevchenko, one of the graduates of the school.

Reserve, youth and junior teams

Dynamo Kyiv has several reserve teams. Dynamo reserve teams competed in national competitions since 1946. The club was fielding its reserve team in the Soviet Top League competitions for reserve teams (so called doubles) that existed in 1946–1991. Dynamo doubles team holds a record for number of champion titles of the Soviet Top League for doubles winning it 15 times with a closest pursuing Spartak doubles team trailing with 9 titles. In 2004 the club revived its reserve team which later became youth (U-21) team competing at Ukrainian Premier League competitions for U-21 and U-19 teams. Dynamo football school (academy) fields few teams in Ukrainian Youth Football League as well as Kyiv city football league. Among possibly most exotic football academy graduates is a former Moroccan international Tarik El Jarmouni.

Besides its normal junior squads, FC Dynamo Kyiv also has fielded its second team Dynamo-2 which competed among regular "teams of masters" (Soviet analog of professional teams) as well as republican competitions (amateur level) during the Soviet period. The first time the team participated in football competitions at professional level was in 1964 when it took part in the Soviet Second League (in so called the Ukrainian Soviet football competitions). With dissolution of the Soviet Union in 1991, Dynamo-2 was revived based on the Dynamo's reserve team that participated in the Soviet Top League for doubles. The team continued to play in Ukrainian First League for over 20 years. Along with the second team, Dynamo created also its third team Dynamo-3 which at first played at amateur level and later advanced to Ukrainian Second League. Since 2016, Dynamo has discontinued its numbered team.

Reserve team (under-21) honours
 Soviet Top League (reserves): 15 (record)
 1949, 1963, 1965, 1966, 1968, 1972, 1974, 1976, 1977, 1980, 1981, 1982, 1983, 1985, 1990
 Ukrainian Premier League (reserves / under-21): 6 (record)
 2004–05, 2005–06, 2006–07, 2007–08, 2015–16, 2016–17

Other departments

Since parting from its parent Dynamo society in 1989, Dynamo Kyiv becoming exclusively a football club (other departments were left with the Kyiv city branch of Dynamo–Ukraine) had also its own women team which while not being as successful as the main team, had some degree of success when they were playing first at Soviet and later at Ukrainian competitions. In 1994 the whole women department was liquidated as the owners of the club lost interest in it. 

In 2017 the Ukrainian Association of Football pursued existing men football clubs to help with development of women's football in Ukraine and either create own teams or adopt already existing teams of separate women football clubs or sports schools. 

In 2021 Dynamo in cooperation with the Kyivan Olympic College reestablished its women football team replacing the college team at the second tier of the two-tier national football pyramid for women and gained promotion the same season.

Supporters and rivalries

The Dynamo fan movement is one of the oldest in Ukraine. Active support began in 1980s during the Soviet period (Ukrainian SSR). Then began to appear first graffiti with the team's logo and was registered one of the biggest fights in the USSR: Dynamo fans against fans of Spartak Moscow in the center of Kyiv. In the 1990s on the stands became popular English style.
	

	
Dynamo ultras are usually associated with right-wing politics and many adhere to nationalist ideas. Historically they would frequently hold patriotic (Ukrainian nationalism) and strongly anti-communist actions. During the reign of Viktor Yanukovych the ultras had bad relations with the government, caused by persecutions of fans and other political factors. The most publicized action was "Freedom Pavlichenko" in support of political prisoners father and son Pavlichenko. The ultras Dynamo took part in the Independence Day of Ukraine and Heroes Day celebrations.

Dynamo ultras often use the image of Sviatoslav the Brave in the design of their banners. Svyatoslav, a printed magazine of Dynamo ultras, also bears the Kyiv prince's name.

The most famous derby in Ukraine is Ukrainian derby, always held in a tense atmosphere. Dynamo maintains friendly relations with: Karpaty Lviv, Dnipro Dnipropetrovsk (Braty po zbroyi; Band of Brothers), Hutnik Kraków and with Zalgiris Vilnius, GNK Dinamo Zagreb, Dinamo Tbilisi, Stade Rennais F.C. fans. Strained relations with: Shakhtar Donetsk, Chornomorets Odesa, Metalist Kharkiv, Spartak Moscow and Legia Warsaw. Now all fans have declared a truce because of the war in Eastern Ukraine. They play the Kyiv derby with Arsenal Kyiv, a strong rivalry also due to politics; Arsenal fans are known to be strongly left-wing.

Kit suppliers and shirt sponsors

Presidents and other officials

Presidents
 1927–1989: part of Dynamo, the republican section of Soviet sports society Dynamo
 1989–1993: Viktor Bezverkhy
 1993–2002: Hryhoriy Surkis
 2002–present: Ihor Surkis

Vice-Presidents
 2005–2010: Mykhailo Oshenkov (son of Oleg Oshenkov)
 2005–2010: Vadym Kostiuchenko
 2018–2020: Yevhen Krasnikov
 1993–2011: Vitaliy Sivkov

General directors
 2007–present:  Rezo Chohonelidze

Sports directors
 2011–2019: Oleksiy Mykhailychenko
 2018–2019:  Eduardo Docampo
 2020–2021: Oleksiy Mykhailychenko

Technical directors
 1992: Mykhailo Oshenkov (son of Oleg Oshenkov)

Players

First team squad

U-19 team

Out on loan

Retired number(s)

12 –  Club Supporters (the 12th Man)

Coaches and administration

Notable coaches

 In the Ukrainian championship
The following individuals have all won at least one trophy while coaching Dynamo Kyiv:

Club records and statistics
Oleksandr Shovkovskyi currently holds Dynamo's official appearance record, having made 637 appearances in all competitions, over the course of 17 seasons from 1993 until 2016. He also holds the record for Ukrainian Premier League (Vyshcha Liha) appearances with 426, while Oleh Blokhin remains unreachable for Soviet Top League appearances with 432.

Including all competitions, Oleh Blokhin is the all-time leading goalscorer for Dynamo with 266 goals since joining the club in 1969, 211 of which were scored in Soviet Top League (another Dynamo record). Serhiy Rebrov, who is the all-time topscorer for Ukrainian Premier League, comes in second in all competitions with 163.

Dynamo Kyiv qualified for continental competitions for the last 32 years since 1990 and missed only twice (two seasons) since 1973.

Divisional movements

Soviet Union

Ukraine

Dynamo Kyiv in European competitions

Dynamo Kyiv made a forceful entrance into European competitions in the 1965–66 European Cup Winners' Cup, advancing into the quarter-finals before losing to Celtic F.C. The club is a regular visitor to UEFA competitions, having participated in over 50 tournaments. Dynamo Kyiv has not missed a single season of European competition since 1990 and, since 1973, has only missed out twice (1984–85 and 1988–89). During the Soviet era, the club won the European Cup Winners' Cup twice, in 1975 and 1986, the 1975 European Super Cup and reached the semi finals of the European Cup/Champions League three times, once under the Ukrainian banner.

European cups finals

UEFA club coefficient ranking
As of 5 May 2021Source:

UEFA Rankings since 2007 

Source:

Player records

Top goalscorers

Other – National Super Cup

Most appearances

Other – National Super Cup

See also
FC Dynamo-2 Kyiv
FC Dynamo-3 Kyiv

References

External links

Official website 
Youtube channel

 
Ukrainian Premier League clubs
Soviet Top League clubs
Association football clubs established in 1927
1927 establishments in Ukraine
Football clubs in Kyiv
Unrelegated association football clubs
Football clubs in the Ukrainian Soviet Socialist Republic
Police association football clubs in the Soviet Union
UEFA Cup Winners' Cup winning clubs
UEFA Super Cup winning clubs
Dynamo (Ukraine)